30000 series may refer to:

Japanese train types
 Kintetsu 30000 series EMU
 Nankai 30000 series EMU
 Odakyu 30000 series EXE EMU
 Osaka Municipal Subway 30000 series EMU
 Seibu 30000 series EMU
 Tobu 30000 series EMU